Sergei Nikolayevich Tarakanov (alternative spellings: Serguei, Sergey) (born 25 April 1958 in Lodeynoye Pole, Leningrad Oblast, Russian SFSR, USSR) is a Russian retired professional basketball player. During his playing career, he was a 2.03 m (6'8") tall small forward-power forward.

Club career
Tarakanov played at the club level with Spartak Leningrad (1975–1979), CSKA Moscow (1979–1990, winning 7 times the Soviet Basketball League championship), the German club Ludwisburg Stuttgart (1990–1991), and the Belgian club Liège Basket (1991–1992).

National team career
Tarakanov was a member of the senior Soviet national team from 1979 to 1990. As a player of the Soviet national team, Tarakanov won: 3 gold medals at FIBA EuroBasket (1979, 1981, and 1985), the silver medal at EuroBasket 1987, the bronze medal at EuroBasket 1983, the gold medal at the 1982 FIBA World Championship, the silver medal at the 1986 FIBA World Championship, the gold medal at the 1988 Summer Olympic Games, and the bronze medal at the 1980 Summer Olympic Games.

References

External links
The Legend, CSKA Moscow: Sergey Tarakanov
FIBA Profile
FIBA Europe Profile
Sports-Reference.com Profile
Basketball-Reference.com Profile

1958 births
Living people
Basketball players at the 1980 Summer Olympics
Basketball players at the 1988 Summer Olympics
BC Spartak Saint Petersburg players
PBC CSKA Moscow players
FIBA EuroBasket-winning players
FIBA World Championship-winning players
Liège Basket players
Medalists at the 1980 Summer Olympics
Medalists at the 1988 Summer Olympics
Riesen Ludwigsburg players
Olympic basketball players of the Soviet Union
Olympic bronze medalists for the Soviet Union
Olympic gold medalists for the Soviet Union
Olympic medalists in basketball
Power forwards (basketball)
Russian men's basketball players
Small forwards
Soviet men's basketball players
1982 FIBA World Championship players
1986 FIBA World Championship players
FIBA Hall of Fame inductees
People from Leningrad Oblast
Sportspeople from Leningrad Oblast